The Monterey County Sheriff's Office is the county law enforcement agency for Monterey County, California. It provides protection and law enforcement to the non-municipal areas of Monterey County. The Sheriff's Office has about 300 employees and a budget of over 50 million dollars.

History
The Sheriff's Office was founded in 1850; and as such the department is one hundred and fifty-eight years old. The Sheriff's Office is one of the oldest law enforcement agencies in the state of California.

In 2014, a federal judge issued an injunction against Sheriff Scott Miller barring him from campaigning in uniform.

In October 2022, the League of United Latin American Citizens stated that four victims had asked for support with sexual harassment complains against the office, and called for an oversight board. Also in October, two senior officers were terminated, one for unearned overtime, and one for receiving stolen prescription drugs.

Tina Nieto was elected the county's first Latina sheriff in November 2022.

List of Monterey County Sheriffs 

1. William Roach 1850–1853
2. Aaron Lyons 1854–1855
3. John B. Keating 1856–1857
4. Henry DeGraw 1858–1859
5. Aaron E. Lyons 1860–1864 (Died in office)
6. James B. Smith 1864–1865
7. Thomas Watson 1866–1871
8. Andrew Wesson 1872–1873
9. James B. Smith 1874–1875
10. James E. Graves 1876–1877
11. John C. Franks 1878–1882
12. James E. Graves 1883–1888
13. James A. Horton 1889–1892
14. John L. Matthew 1893–1898
15. Henry R. Farley 1899–1899 (Killed in office)
16. Melvin R. Keef 1899–1902
17. William J. Nesbitt 1902–1923
18. William A. Oyer 1924–1927
19. Carl H. Abbott 1928–1940 (Died in office)
20. J. A. Cornett* 1940–1940
21. Alexander H. Bordges 1940–1946 (Died in office)
22. J. A. Cornett* 1946–1946
23. Jack L. McCoy 1946–1957
24. Victor V. Tibbs 1957–1963
25. William J. Davenport 1963–1979
26. David B. "Bud" Cook 1979–1991
27. Norman G. Hicks 1991–1999
28. Gordon Sonne 1999–2003
29. Mike Kanalakis 2003–2010
30. Scott Miller 2011–2014
31. Steve Bernal 2015–Present *
 J. A. Cornett (coroner) served as interim Sheriff after deaths in office of Sheriff Abbott and Bordges until new elections could be held.

List of Fallen Monterey County Sheriff's Officials 

1. Monterey County Constable William Hardmont, September 2, 1854
2. Deputy Jose Joaquin Carmen Santiago de la Torre, November 10, 1855
3. Sheriff's Posse Deputy Charles Layton, November 10, 1855
4. Sheriff Henry Reed Farley, September 18, 1899
5. Sheriff's Posse Special Officer Noah H. Rader, July 25, 1925
6. Deputy Craig Lingley Knox, June 1, 1980
7. Deputy Jerralee Jane Jacobus, June 1, 1980
8. Deputy Robert "Bob" Jefferson Shaw IV, April 9, 1988
9. Deputy Anthony "Tony" James Olson, September 24, 1996

References

Sheriff
Monterey
Monterey County Sheriff's